Montour Township is a township in Columbia County, Pennsylvania. It is part of Northeastern Pennsylvania. 

The population was 1,263 at the time of the 2020 census.

History
The Rupert Covered Bridge No. 56 was listed on the National Register of Historic Places in 1979.

Geography

Montour Township is in western Columbia County, bordered on the west by Montour County. The Susquehanna River forms the southern and part of the eastern boundary, and Fishing Creek forms the remainder of the eastern boundary, separating the township from the town of Bloomsburg, the county seat. 

The unincorporated community of Rupert is located in the eastern part of the township, near the mouth of Fishing Creek.

Demographics

As of the census of 2000, there were 1,437 people, 592 households, and 425 families residing in the township.

The population density was 155.9 people per square mile (60.2/km). There were 612 housing units at an average density of 66.4/sq mi (25.6/km).

The racial makeup of the township was 97.91% White, 0.42% African American, 0.14% Native American, 0.21% Asian, 0.21% from other races, and 1.11% from two or more races. Hispanic or Latino of any race were 0.84% of the population.

There were 592 households, out of which 29.1% had children under the age of eighteen living with them; 57.8% were married couples living together, 8.4% had a female householder with no husband present, and 28.2% were non-families. 23.6% of all households were made up of individuals, and 9.6% had someone living alone who was sixty-five years of age or older.

The average household size was 2.43 and the average family size was 2.84.

In the township the population was spread out, with 22.3% under the age of eighteen, 7.0% from eighteen to twenty-four, 26.9% from twenty-five to forty-four, 27.1% from forty-five to sixty-four, and 16.7% who were sixty-five years of age or older. The median age was forty-two years. 

For every one hundred females, there were 96.6 males. For every one hundred females aged eighteen and over, there were 96.3 males.

The median income for a household in the township was $38,125, and the median income for a family was $42,583. Males had a median income of $31,250 compared with that of $22,868 for females. 

The per capita income for the township was $18,670.

Roughly 7.8% of families and 10.1% of the population were living below the poverty line, including 13.3% of those who were under the age of eighteen and 6.0% of those aged sixty-five or over.

References

External links
Montour Township official website

Populated places established in 1788
Bloomsburg–Berwick metropolitan area
Townships in Columbia County, Pennsylvania
Townships in Pennsylvania
1788 establishments in Pennsylvania